Oneirophanta mutabilis is a species of sea cucumbers in the family Deimatidae. It is the type species of the genus Oneirophanta. It is found on the seabed at abyssal depths. It was first described by the Swedish zoologist Hjalmar Théel in 1879, being one of the many deep sea animals discovered during the Challenger expedition of 1872–1876.

Etymology

The generic name is from Greek όνειρο (oneiro), 'dream', and φαίνομαι (phainomai), 'to appear', the thing that appears as in a dream. The specific name is Latin mutabilis, meaning changeable.

Description
The mouth is at the anterior end of the ventral surface and is surrounded by a ring of twenty tentacles of varying lengths, the tip of each of which has eight projections round the margin. The tube feet on the ventral surface vary in number and are usually in a single row or scattered irregularly. The skin is rough, brittle and somewhat transparent and the colour of preserved specimens is white, pale brown or dark brown.

Distribution and habitat
Oneirophanta mutabilis is found on the seabed at abyssal depths in most of the world's oceans. In the nearly level Porcupine Abyssal Plain in the Atlantic Ocean there is a bed of sediment that has been gradually accumulating for millennia and Oneirophanta mutabilis is one of a number of sea cucumbers that make up about 90% of the megafauna here.

Behaviour
Oneirophanta mutabilis moves slowly across the sediment on the seabed leaving a trail on the surface. As it progresses it ingests the sediment, processes it through its gut, removes the nutritive organic content and voids the indigestible remains.

Little is known of the reproduction of this species. The eggs are smaller than 400 µm in diameter with little nutritive tissue present which suggests some form of abbreviated development. Whatever it is, it  appears to be a successful breeding strategy because this species is very abundant.

References

Elasipodida
Animals described in 1879
Taxa named by Johan Hjalmar Théel